Fina Casalderrey (born 11 August 1951) is a Spanish writer and educator, considered to be one of the most important writers of Galician children's literature.

Life and career 
She was born in Xeve in Pontevedra and began a career in teaching. She first began writing for the theatre before turning to children's books and later books on gastronomy.

Casalderry is a member of the Royal Galician Academy. Her work has been translated into more than a dozen languages. She has also written scripts for a number of short films.

Selected works

Children's literature 
 Dos lágrimas por máquina (1992) received the 
 El estanque de los patos pobres (1996) received the 
 El lago de las niñas mudas, children's literature (2007) received the

Gastronomy 
 El libro de la empanada (1993)
 Fiestas gastronómicas de Galicia (1994)

Films 
 Garuda (2010)
 Dos letras (2011)
 Querido Tomás (2013)
 La última moneda (2016)

References

External links 

 
 

1951 births
Living people
Spanish children's writers
Spanish women children's writers
Galician-language writers